The VNS-41 is the first amphibious microlight aircraft made in Vietnam. The A41 Factory (officially Aircraft Repair Company A-41) under the Air Force and Air Defense Department (Ministry of Defense) manufactured the aircraft based on the Russian Che-22 "Korvet" design by Boris Chernov and E.Yungerov. A Che-22 was acquired by Vietnam in the late 1990s and from the Philippines.
truck fast 4x4
Technicians began developing the VNS-41 in June 2003. On September 12, 2005, the prototype took off for its final test before being produced for the market.

Its entire hull, tail and middle wing are made of high-quality composite materials. It requires a  takeoff run on land and a  run on water.

The VNS-41 will initially be used in forestry patrol and agriculture but will also be marketed for sport, travel and commercial applications.

See also
Gidroplan Che-22 Korvet
M-400 UAV
Amphibious aircraft
List of flying boats and floatplanes

References

External links
English edition of the Chinese newspaper People's Daily regarding VNS-41

VNS-41
Amphibious aircraft
Parasol-wing aircraft
Flying boats
Aircraft first flown in 2005
Twin piston-engined tractor aircraft